was a Japanese writer and sex worker. She is best known for her blog , which was published as a book in 1998.

Biography

Early life and career
Natsumi was born in 1973 in the Kantō region of Japan. After graduating high school, Natsumi began working as a clerk at a clothing store. She later transitioned to the water trade, alternately working as an erotic masseuse, at image clubs, and in soaplands. She additionally worked as a nude model for erotic books and adult films, though after being arrested for indecent exposure after stripping nude on a street in Shinjuku for a photo shoot in 1996, she retired from modeling.

In the mid-1990s, Natsumi began publishing a blog about her experiences as a sex worker titled . The blog was later published as a book by the Japanese publishing house Yosensha in 1998; its success prompted Natsumi to become a full-time author of novels and manga. "Vulgarity Drifting Diary", an English-language column by Natsumi, was published in the American manga magazine Pulp.

Personal life and death
In her writing, Natsumi referenced having once been married to an unnamed husband whom she divorced. She reported having a troubled relationship with her parents, particularly her father.

On November 4, 2002, Natsumi died at the age of 29. The cause of death was not released, beyond that she had been in poor health since mid-2002 and experienced a "sudden change in health". A private funeral was held. In February 2003, a commemorative issue of the literary magazine Bungei was published in Natsumi's memory.

Works
, Yosensha, 1998; republished by Kobunsha in 2000
, Futami Shobo, 1998
, Kobunsha, 2000
, Akita Shoten, 2000
, Kadokawa Shoten, 2001
, Kadokawa Shoten, 2002
 (Seikatsusha, 2002)
, Kadokawa Shoten, 2003

References

Bibliography

Further reading
 "Welcome to the Flesh Market", excerpt from The Sexual Adventures of Hikaru Natsumi at Nerve (via the Wayback Machine)

External links
 (posts from before 1999; in Japanese)
 (posts from 1999 to 2003; in Japanese)

1973 births
2002 deaths
21st-century Japanese novelists
Japanese women novelists
Japanese bloggers
Japanese women bloggers
Japanese models
Japanese columnists
Japanese women columnists
Japanese sex workers